Mobile television is television watched on a small handheld or mobile device, typically developed for that purpose. It includes service delivered via mobile phone networks, received free-to-air via terrestrial television stations, or via satellite broadcast. Regular broadcast standards or special mobile TV transmission formats can be used. Additional features include downloading TV programs and podcasts from the Internet and storing programming for later viewing.

According to the Harvard Business Review, the growing adoption of smartphones allowed users to watch as much mobile video in three days of the 2010 Winter Olympics as they watched throughout the entire 2008 Summer Olympics, a five-fold increase. However, except in South Korea, consumer acceptance of broadcast mobile TV has been limited due to lack of compatible devices.

Early mobile TV receivers were based on old analog television systems. They were the earliest televisions that could be placed in a coat pocket. The first was the Panasonic IC TV MODEL TR-001, introduced in 1970. The second was sold to the public by Clive Sinclair in January 1977. It was called the Microvision or the MTV-1. It had a two-inch (50 mm) CRT screen and was also the first television which could pick up signals in multiple countries. It measured  x  ×  and was sold for less than £100 in the UK and for around $400 in the United States. The project took over ten years to develop and was funded by around £1.6 million in British government grants.

In 2002, South Korea was the first country to introduce commercial mobile TV via 2G CDMA IS95-C, and 3G (CDMA2000 1X EVDO) networks. In 2005, South Korea became the first country to broadcast satellite mobile TV via DMB (S-DMB) on May 1, and terrestrial DMB (T-DMB) on December 1. South Korea and Japan are developing the sector. Mobile TV services were launched in Hong Kong during March 2006 by the operator CSL on the 3G network. BT launched mobile TV in the United Kingdom in September 2006, although the service was abandoned less than a year later. Germany had a failed endeavor with MFD Mobiles Fernsehen Deutschland, who launched their DMB-based service June 2006 in Germany, but ended it in April 2008. Also in June 2006, mobile operator 3 in Italy (part of Hutchison Whampoa) launched their mobile TV service, but in contrast to Germany's MFD it was based on the European DVB-H standard. In the US Verizon Wireless and AT&T offered MediaFLO, a subscription service from March 2007 until March 2011.

In the 2010s, specialised mobile TV platforms and protocols have been discontinued with the rapid deployment of LTE cellular network and rising popularity of streaming television over the internet from modern smartphones.

Digital television

North America
, there were 120 stations in the United States broadcasting using the ATSC-M/H "Mobile DTV" standard – a mobile and handheld enhancement to the HDTV standard that improves handling of multipath interference while mobile.

Broadcast mobile DTV development

While MediaFLO used the TV spectrum and MobiTV used cell phone networks, "mobile DTV" (ATSC-M/H) used the digital TV spectrum.

ION Media Networks started a test station on channel 38, which was to be used for digital LPTV, which used a single-frequency network (SFN). In some areas, more than one TV transmitter would be needed to cover all areas. Mobile DTV could have been used at that time because it would not affect HDTV reception. A single standard, however, had to be developed.

Gannett Broadcasting president David Lougee pointed out that many of those attending the inauguration of Barack Obama would likely hear him but not see him; had the new technology been in place, this would not have been a problem.

In April 2009, the Open Mobile Video Coalition, made up of over 800 broadcast stations, selected four test stations: Gannett's WATL, ION's WPXA-TV in Atlanta, Fisher Communications' KOMO-TV, and Belo Corporation's KONG-TV in Seattle. WPXA had begun mobile DTV broadcasting on April 1. The others would begin in May.

ION chairman and CEO Brandon Burgess said mobile DTV lets stations "think beyond the living room and bring live television and real time information to consumers wherever they may be."
The Advanced Television Systems Committee started work on mobile DTV standards in May 2007, and manufacturers and sellers worked quickly to make the new technology a reality.

The technology was expected to be used for Opinion polls and even voting. By the end of the year, the ATSC and the Consumer Electronics Association began identifying products meeting the standard with "MDTV".

Paul Karpowicz, NAB Television Board chairman and president of Meredith Broadcast Group, said "This milestone ushers in the new era of digital television broadcasting, giving local TV stations and networks new opportunities to reach viewers on the go. This will introduce the power of local broadcasting to a new generation of viewers and provide all-important emergency alert, local news and other programming to consumers across the nation."

ION technology vice president Brett Jenkins said, "We're really at a stage like the initial launch of DTV back in 1998. There are almost going to be more transmitters transmitting mobile than receive devices on the market, and that's probably what you'll see for the next six to nine months."

Devices would eventually include USB dongles, netbooks, portable DVD players and in-car displays.

White House officials and members of Congress saw the triple-play concept in an ION demonstration on July 28, 2009 in conjunction with the OMVC. Another demonstration took place October 16, 2009 with journalists, industry executives and broadcasters riding around Washington, D.C. in a bus with prototype devices. Included were those who would be testing the devices in the Washington and Baltimore markets in January 2010.

Progress

On August 7, 2009, BlackBerry service began on six TV stations. Eventually 27 other stations are expected to offer the service. By October, 30 stations were airing mobile DTV signals, and that number is expected to grow to 50. Also in the same month, FCC chair Julius Genachowski announced an effort to increase the spectrum available to wireless services.
Also in August, WTVE and Axcera began testing a single-frequency network (SFN) with multiple transmitters using the new mobile standard. The RNN affiliate in Reading, Pennsylvania had used this concept since 2007.

An amplified antenna or higher power for the transmitting station would likely be needed, as well as repeater stations where terrain is a problem. Lougee, whose company planned testing in its 19 markets in 2010, said the chip designs with the new devices made targeted advertising possible.

In December 2009, Concept Enterprises introduced the first mobile DTV tuner for automobiles. Unlike earlier units, this one provides a clear picture without pixelation in a fast-moving vehicle, using an LG M/H chip and a one-inch roof-mounted antenna. No subscription is required.
Also in December, the Consumer Electronics Association hosted a "plugfest" in Washington, D.C. to allow manufacturers to test various devices. More than 15 companies, and engineers from different countries, tested four transmission systems, 12 receiver systems, and four software types.
On December 1, News Corp. chairman Rupert Murdoch said mobile DTV would be important to the future of all journalism, and he planned to offer TV and possibly newspaper content in this way.

Wireless broadband, which some wanted to replace broadcasting, would not be able to handle the demand for video services. ION's Burgess showed off one of the first iPhones capable of receiving mobile DTV, while ION's Jenkins showed an LG Maze, a Valups, and a Tivit; the latter sends signals to the iPod Touch and is expected to soon work with the Google Nexus. Sinclair Broadcast Group director of advanced technology Mark Aitken said the mobile DTV concept of multiple transmitters would help free up spectrum for wireless broadband in rural areas but not large cities. He also explained to the FCC that mobile DTV was the best method for sending out live video to those using cell phones and similar devices.

The OMVC's Mobile DTV Consumer Showcase began May 3, 2010, and lasted all summer. Nine stations planned to distribute 20 programs, including local and network shows as well as cable programs, to Samsung Moment phones. Dell Netbooks and Valups Tivits also received programming.

On September 23, 2010, Media General began its first MDTV service at WCMH-TV in Columbus, Ohio and had plans to do the same a month later at WFLA-TV in the Tampa Bay, Florida area and five to seven more stations in its portfolio.

On November 19, 2010, a joint venture of 12 major broadcasters known as the Mobile Content Venture (MCV) announced plans to upgrade TV stations in 20 markets representing 40 percent of the United States population to deliver live video to portable devices by the end of 2011.

Brian Lawlor, a Scripps TV senior vice president said that in September 2011, Scripps stations would offer a mobile app allowing people with an iPhone or iPad to see emergency information (e.g. weather bulletins) in the event of a power outage. In 2012, a number of stations plan to conduct tests of the Mobile Emergency Alert System (M-EAS), a system to deliver emergency information via mobile DTV.

In January 2012, the MCV announced that MetroPCS would offer MCV's Dyle mobile DTV service. Samsung planned an Android phone capable of receiving this service late in 2012. At the end of 2012, Dyle was in 35 markets and capable of reaching 55 percent of viewers. According to the home page on its website, "As of May 22, 2015, Dyle mobile TV is no longer in service, and Dyle-enabled devices and their apps will no longer be supported."

At the NAB show in April 2012, MCV announced that 17 additional television stations would launch mobile DTV, bringing the total to 92, covering more than 55% of US homes. Included are stations in three new markets: Austin, Texas, Boston, Massachusetts, and Dayton, Ohio.

In September 2012, WRAL-TV announced rollout of a Mobile Emergency Alert System based around mobile digital television technology.

By early 2013, 130 stations were providing content, but adoption of devices such as dongles was not widespread.

According to NPD's "Free Streaming TV" report, released in February 2013, 12 percent of United States TV watchers reported streaming TV shows for free during the prior three months, compared to 14 percent who watched a TV show via SVOD.

Standards

Mobile network 
eMBMS (Evolved Mobile Broadcast Multicast Service) – also known as LTE Broadcast, transmissions are delivered through an LTE cellular network

Terrestrial 
1seg (One Segment) – Mobile TV system on ISDB-T
ATSC-M/H (ATSC Mobile/Handheld) – North America
DAB-IP (Digital Audio Broadcast) – UK
T-DMB (Terrestrial Digital Multimedia Broadcast) – South Korea
DMB-T/H – China 
DVB-H (Digital Video Broadcasting – Handheld) – European Union, Asia
DVB-T (Digital Video Broadcasting – Terrestrial)
DVB-T2
DVB-T2 Lite – Europe, Africa, Asia and some countries in South America
DVB-NGH
iMB (Integrated Mobile Broadcast, 3GPP MBMS)
ISDB-Tmm (Integrated Services Digital Broadcasting – Terrestrial Mobile Multimedia) – Japan
MediaFLO – launched in US, tested in UK and Germany

Satellite 
CMMB (China Mobile Multimedia Broadcasting) – China
DVB-SH (Digital Video Broadcasting – Satellite for Handhelds) – European Union
S-DMB (Satellite Digital Multimedia Broadcast) – South Korea

See also 
Handheld projector
Multimedia Broadcast Multicast Service (MBMS) via the GSM and UMTS cellular networks
IPTV
SPB TV
Mobile DTV Alliance – marketing organization
3 mobile tv (UK)
Mobiclip
MobiTV
Nunet
Mobibase
Handheld television

References

External links

 
Broadcast engineering
Digital television
Mobile telephone broadcasting
Television technology
Telecommunications-related introductions in 1970